Roy Robertson-Harris (born July 23, 1993) is an American football defensive end for the Jacksonville Jaguars of the National Football League (NFL). He played college football at UTEP. Robertson-Harris has also played for the Chicago Bears.

Professional career

Chicago Bears
After going undrafted in the 2016 NFL Draft, Robertson-Harris signed with the Chicago Bears on May 9, 2016. On August 30, 2016, he was placed on the reserve/non-football illness list, where he spent his entire rookie season.

In 2017, Robertson-Harris appeared in 13 games, registering 13 tackles, two sacks, and a pass deflection. The following year, he played in every game as he recorded 20 tackles, three sacks and three tackles for loss. He was an exclusive-rights free agent after the 2018 season, but returned to the Bears after being tendered a contract on March 13, 2019, which he officially signed on April 15.

In week 1 of the 2019 season against the Green Bay Packers, Robertson-Harris sacked Aaron Rodgers once as the Bears lost 10–3. In week 4 against the Minnesota Vikings, Robertson-Harris sacked Kirk Cousins 1.5 times in the 16–6 win.

On March 13, 2020, the Bears placed a second-round restricted free agent tender on Robertson-Harris. He signed the tender on April 15. On November 9, it was reported that Robertson-Harris would under go season ending shoulder surgery after missing out the Bears' Week 9 contest against the Tennessee Titans. He was placed on injured reserve on November 12, 2020.

Jacksonville Jaguars
On March 17, 2021, Robertson-Harris signed a three-year, $23.4 million contract with the Jacksonville Jaguars. On October 2, 2022, Robertson-Harris recorded nine total tackles and a tackle for loss during a 29–21 loss to the Philadelphia Eagles.

On February 25, Robertson-Harris signed a three-year, $30 million extension with the Jaguars, keeping him under contract through the 2026 season.

References

External links
 Chicago Bears bio

Living people
1993 births
American football defensive ends
American football linebackers
Chicago Bears players
Jacksonville Jaguars players
People from Grand Prairie, Texas
Players of American football from Oakland, California
Players of American football from Texas
Sportspeople from the Dallas–Fort Worth metroplex
UTEP Miners football players